The Mimbres is a  river in southwestern New Mexico.

Course 
The river ends in the Guzmán Basin, a small endorheic basin east of Deming in Luna County. The uplands watershed are administered by the United States Forest Service, while the land in the Mimbres Valley is mostly privately owned. The upper reaches of the river are perennial. The river flows south from the Black Range, and the surface flow of the river dissipates in the desert north of Deming, but the river bed and storm drainage continue eastward, any permanent flow remaining underground. The Mimbres River Basin has an area of about 13,000 km² (5,140 mi²) and extends slightly into northern Chihuahua, Mexico.

Conservation
A wide diversity of species (37 species; excluding arthropods other than crustaceans) are of great conservation concern. Eighteen species (49%) are classified as "vulnerable, imperiled, or critically imperiled"  statewide as well as nationally. Additionally 13 species are classified as "vulnerable, imperiled, or critically imperiled" in the state although they are  secure nationally. Birds, mammals, amphibians, and reptiles are also of concern within the riparian, ephemeral and terrestrial habitats.

The use of water from the Mimbres River is still a matter of contention.

Human history

The Mimbres Basin supported the prehistoric Mimbres culture, which was part of the larger Mogollon culture. The culture developed from around 200 to 1000 CE, known as the pithouse period. During this time the use of pottery increased, and there was a greater dependence on agriculture throughout the Mogollon area. This agriculture increasingly depended upon irrigation from the perennial and storm flow of the Mimbres River. In the later part of the pithouse period, distinctive Mimbres pottery black-on-white designs grew more complex and ornate. Villages and irrigation complexes grew larger, and large kivas were built. These community ritual constructions were destroyed around 900 CE in huge ceremonial fires. This marked a major transition in social and ritual practices.

See also
List of rivers of New Mexico
Oasisamerica cultures
Swarts Ruin

Footnotes

External links
Map of Mimbres River Basin using Flash
Upper Mimbres Water Master District
Mimbres Pottery
Peabody hosts show of distinctive Native American bowls (Mimbres)

Rivers of New Mexico
Endorheic basins of the United States
Geography of Grant County, New Mexico
Geography of Luna County, New Mexico
Mogollon culture
Native American history of New Mexico
Oasisamerica cultures
Pre-Columbian cultural areas
Gila National Forest
Rivers of Grant County, New Mexico
Rivers of Luna County, New Mexico